L'amore is the debut single of Sonohra, with which they won the Sanremo Music Festival 2008 in the category 'Giovani'.

The lyrics were written by Luca Fainello together with their producer Roberto Tini, while the music was arranged by Diego Fainello. The single debuted in the charts of digital downloads on the Italian iTunes directly at the 6th spot the week after their victory at Sanremo.

The video of the song was filmed in Ireland on the Cliffs of Moher, by the director Antonella Schioppa.

During an interview given by Radio Touring 104 a few days before the Sanremo Music Festival 2008, Luca Fainello revealed that the song talked of a love between him and an English girl he met while they were still playing in pubs before their music became known.  A few days after having met her, the girl returned to England and Luca lost contact with her.

This song has been translated into Spanish and released on Sonohra's Spanish CD Libres with the title "Buscando L'amor".  It has also been translated into English with the title "Love Is Here" and released on the Brazilian CD Love Show and the Japanese CD L'Amore.

Charts

References

2008 debut singles
2008 songs
Sony BMG singles
Sanremo Music Festival songs